Li Mu (died 229 BC), personal name Zuo (繓), courtesy name Mu (牧), was a Chinese military general of the State of Zhao during the Warring States period. He was named by Chinese historians as one of the four greatest generals of the late Warring States period, along with Bai Qi, Wang Jian, and Lian Po. He's highly regarded as one of the best defensive tacticians commanders of ancient warfare.

Life

In 265 BC, Li Mu was stationed in Yanmen Commandery and ordered to defend northwestern commanderies of Yanshan (雁山) and Daijun (代郡) from raids instigated by the Xiongnu (匈奴) and other tribes. He initially adopted an extremely defensive strategy, for which he was accused of cowardice and thereafter replaced by a more aggressive general.

The Zhao state prepared an army of 1,300 war chariots, 13,000 cavalry, 50,000 infantry and 100,000 archers. The army was scattered in the countryside. The Xiongnu sent a small force to raid the border, and Li Mu pretended to be defeated, and abandoned a few thousand men to the Xiongnu. The chanyu (or shan-yü, title for the chief of the Xiongnu) heard of this and then sent a large force to invade Zhao. The Zhao divided into two armies, encircled and beat the Xiongnu, killing hundreds of thousands of men and horses. Then the Zhao exterminated the Dan Lan, defeated the Dong Hu, forced the Lin Hu to surrender, making the shan-yü flee.

In 243 BC, Li Mu took over command in the war against Yan and managed to conquer Wusui (武遂) and Fangcheng (方城).

Later, as the threat from Qin increased with the previous ascension of King Zheng, Li Mu turned his focus more towards the western parts of Zhao. However, the State of Zhao was significantly weakened. After having previously suffered utter defeat at the hands of Qin forces led by Bai Qi during, and in the aftermath of, the Battle of Changping in 260 BC, in which Zhao had lost virtually its entire army, most of the core Zhao territories had fallen to Qin. Furthermore, Zhao was diplomatically isolated as the Kingdoms of Wei, Yan, and Han were too weak to offer any kind of support, while Qi and Chu were more willing to see the kingdom extinguished than face the powerful Qin.

Nevertheless, Li Mu could still hold out against and compete with the much stronger Qin forces. So while Qin could raid Wei and Han at will, they had a much harder time pillaging in Zhao.

In 233 BC, when Qin forces attacked the cities of Chili (赤麗) and Xuan'an (宣安), Li Mu erected a fortified camp at Feidi (肥地; in present-day Gaocheng District, Hebei) and waited for the Qin general Huan Yi (桓齮) to divide his army and attack one of the divisions. The plan succeeded, and Li Mu defeated the Qin army at Yi'an (宜安; around present-day Shijiazhuang, Hebei). He was rewarded with the title of Marquis of Wu'an (武安君). A year later, he again defeated the Qin army at Fanwu (番吾; in present-day Pingshan, Hebei).

Eliminating Li Mu became a necessity for Qin to conquer Zhao and ultimately to unify China. In 229 BC, in light of Wang Jian's invasion of Zhao, the Qin sent spies to the Zhao court, bribing key courtiers such as Guo Kai (郭開) and Han Cang (韓倉) in order to convince them to persuade the King of Zhao to replace Li Mu and Sima Shang (司馬尚) with Zhao Cong (趙蔥) and Yan Ju (顏聚) as generals by alleging that the former were planning a rebellion. The plan succeeded. 

Li Mu was expelled from his position and soon thereafter either executed or forced to commit suicide on the king's orders.

With Li Mu's death, the fall of Zhao became inevitable. In just a few years' time King Dai would fall and the State of Zhao would fade into history.

Legacy
Li Mu sometimes appears as a menshen on Chinese and Taoist temples, usually paired with Bai Qi. He is also commemorated at Zhenbian Hall, a temple beside the Tianxian Gate at Yanmen Pass in Shanxi.

In popular culture
In Hara Yasuhisa's famous manga Kingdom he is portrayed as a major antagonist known as "Ri Boku" under the Japanese pronunciation of the same name.  He considers himself a pacifist but nonetheless is actually a genius strategist and one of the "Three Great Heavens of Zhao", making him one of the best generals in the series. He held the position of "Prime Minister of the State of Zhao" until he was stripped of that title by the king. His excellent skills at warfare are on par with other prominent tacticians like Wang Jian and Lord Changping.

He was always interested in Li Xin's ability in that manga, recognizing his on growing talent. 

In a one-shot manga that Yasuhisa wrote before publishing Kingdom, it details his background and youth.

References

Citations

Bibliography
 .
 Di Cosmo, 'Ancient China and its Enemies', 2308.

Year of birth unknown
229 BC deaths
3rd-century BC Chinese people
Chinese gods
Deified Chinese people
Generals from Hebei
Zhao (state)
Zhou dynasty generals